In Memory of ... is a ballet in one act made by New York City Ballet ballet master Jerome Robbins to Berg's Violin Concerto (To the Memory of an Angel) of 1935 (written on the death of Manon Gropius, daughter of Alma Mahler, Gustav Mahler's widow, and Walter Gropius), based on themes from Mahler, a Carpathian folk song, and Bach's O Ewigkeit, du Donnerwort, BWV 20. The premiere took place on 13 June 1985 at the New York State Theater, Lincoln Center, with scenery by David Mitchell, costumes by Dain Marcus and lighting by Jennifer Tipton. A recording aired on PBS' Great Performances: Dance in America in 1987.

Original cast
Suzanne Farrell
Joseph Duell
Adam Lüders

References 
 
  
Playbill, NYCB, Tuesday, June 17, 2008 
 
Repertory Week, NYCB, Spring season, 2008 repertory, week 8

Reviews  
  
NY Times by Anna Kisslegoff, June 15, 1985
 
NY Times by Jack Anderson, June 26, 2001
NY Times by Gia Kourlas, June 16, 2008

Ballets by Jerome Robbins
Ballets to the music of Alban Berg
Ballets to the music of Johann Sebastian Bach
Ballets designed by Jennifer Tipton
1985 ballet premieres
New York City Ballet repertory